During the lifetime of Space Shuttle, Rockwell International and many other organizations studied various Space Shuttle designs. These studies included different ways to increase shuttle payload capability, crew capacity, and developing standalone reusable launch vehicles. A large focus of the program was towards new shuttle boosters and an upgrade to the external tank but also looked to expand NASA's ability to launch deep space missions and build large modular space stations. Many of these concepts and studies would shape the concepts and programs of the 2000s such as Constellation, Orbital Space Plane Program, and Artemis program.

Shuttle-derived vehicles

Shuttle-C 

The Heavy Lift Launch Vehicle was a study by NASA to turn the Space Shuttle launch stack into a dedicated uncrewed cargo launcher. The external tank and Space Shuttle Solid Rocket Boosters (SRBs) would be combined with a cargo module that took the place of the shuttle orbiter and included the Space Shuttle Main Engines. A ballistic return pod would be used as the main engine structure and carry 2-4 SSMEs as well as mount the payload/booster stage. It would be recovered via parachutes in the Australian outback or northern Mexico. Small lifting wings were added to allow more accurate landings. Various Heavy Lift Launch Vehicle concepts were investigated between 1984 and 1995 and it would eventually become known as the Shuttle-C (the Shuttle-C would not include a ballistic return pod and had expendable engines).

The Shuttle-C concept would theoretically cut development costs for a heavy launch vehicle by re-using technology developed for the shuttle program. End-of-life and space Shuttle hardware would also have been used. One proposal even involved converting the Columbia or Enterprise into a single-use cargo launcher. Before the loss of Space Shuttle Challenger, NASA had expected about 14 shuttle flights a year. In the aftermath of the Challenger incident, it became clear that this launch rate was not feasible for a variety of reasons. With the Shuttle-C, it was thought that the lower maintenance and safety requirements for the uncrewed vehicle would allow a higher flight rate.

The Shuttle-C could also launch an uncrewed lunar lander and propulsion module while a second vehicle would launch the Crew Exploration Vehicle to perform lunar missions.

The Shuttle-C would act as the crewed component of the International Lunar Resources Exploration Concept proposed in 1993.

In the early 1990s, NASA engineers planning a crewed mission to Mars included a Shuttle-C design to launch six non reusable 80-ton segments to create two Mars ships in Earth orbit. After President George W. Bush called for the end of the Space Shuttle by 2010, these proposed configurations were put aside.

Magnum 

The Magnum was a large Super heavy-lift launch vehicle designed by NASA's Marshall Space Flight Center during the mid-1990s. It was to have used two strap-on side boosters, similar to the Space Shuttle Solid Rocket Boosters (SRBs), but using liquid fuel instead. Some designs had the strap-on boosters using wings and jet engines, which would enable them to fly back to the launch area after they were jettisoned in flight. The Magnum was designed to carry around 80 tons of payload into low Earth orbit (LEO).

National Launch System 

The National Launch System (or New Launch System) was a study authorized in 1991 by President George H. W. Bush to outline alternatives to the Space Shuttle for access to Earth orbit. Shortly thereafter, NASA asked Lockheed Missiles and Space, McDonnell Douglas, and TRW to perform a ten-month study.

A series of launch vehicles was proposed, based around the proposed Space Transportation Main Engine (STME) liquid-fuel rocket engine. The STME was to be a simplified, expendable version of the RS-25 engine. The NLS-1 was the largest of three proposed vehicles and would have used a modified Space Shuttle external tank for its core stage. The tank would have fed liquid oxygen and liquid hydrogen to four STMEs attached to the bottom of the tank. A payload or second stage would have fit atop the core stage, and two detachable Space Shuttle Solid Rocket Boosters would have been mounted on the sides of the core stage as on the Shuttle. Period illustrations suggest that much larger rockets than NLS-1 were contemplated, using multiples of the NLS-1 core stage.

Upgraded boosters 
Early studies looked at alternate booster and external tank configurations such as:

 SRM options that placed the SRBs inline but aft of the external tank (ET)
 Liquid rocket boosters, both hydrogen and propane to replace the SRBs 
 Twin and catamaran flyback boosters to replace the SRBs 
 An engine pod aft of the ET fed from twin fuel tanks where the SRBs would normally be located
 An in-line integrated booster/ET with a recoverable aft engine pod
 Tandem boosters and ETs in a variety of recoverable concepts 
 A single booster with multiple ETs (expendable and recoverable)

Advanced Solid Rocket Motor (ASRM) Project 

NASA was planning on replacing the post-Challenger SRBs with a new Advanced Solid Rocket Motor (ASRM) to be built by Aerojet at a new facility, designed by subcontractor, RUST International, on the location of a canceled Tennessee Valley Authority nuclear power plant, at Yellow Creek, Mississippi. The ASRM would have produced additional thrust in order to increase shuttle payload, so that it could carry modules and construction components to the ISS. The ASRM program was canceled in 1993 after robotic assembly systems and computers were on-site and approximately 2 billion dollars spent, in favor of continued use, after design flaw corrections, of the SRB.

Recoverable Liquid Booster 
A large focus of the NASA/MSFC Shuttle Growth Study contract was upgraded Recoverable Liquid Boosters. The boosters would have a similar flight path of the solid rocket motors, separating and deploying a parachute for recovery in the Atlantic Ocean. They were to be water-recoverable and used clam shell doors to protect the engines from salt water immersion.

Liquid Fly-back Booster 
Liquid Flyback Booster concepts date back to the early 1970s. Original Shuttle boosters were massive piloted fly-back boosters. The concept was studied throughout the 1980s but shelved after the Challenger disaster shut down most Shuttle upgrades. The Flyback booster concept reemerged in 1997 during the NASA Liquid Flyback Booster Study. The concept was abandoned due to the massive complications with the systems and the minimal improvements they would provide. The Shuttle Growth Study built on this background by developing design concepts in great detail for the liquid rocket boosters.

Five-Segment Booster 

The 5-segment SRB, which would have required little change to the current shuttle infrastructure, would have allowed the space shuttle to carry an additional  of payload in an 51.6°-inclination orbit, eliminate the dangerous "Return-to-Launch Site" (RTLS) and "Trans-Oceanic Abort" (TAL) modes, and, by using a so-called "dog-leg maneuver", fly south-to-north polar orbiting flights from Kennedy Space Center. After the destruction of Columbia, NASA shelved the five-segment SRB for the Shuttle Program, and the three surviving Orbiters, Discovery, Atlantis, and Endeavour were retired in 2011 after the completion of the International Space Station. One five-segment engineering test motor, ETM-03, was fired on October 23, 2003.

As part of the Constellation program, the first stage of the Ares I rocket was planned to use five-segment SRBs – in September 2009 a five-segment Space Shuttle SRB was static fired on the ground in ATK's desert testing area in Utah.

After the Constellation program was canceled in 2011, the new Space Launch System (SLS) was designated to use five-segment boosters. The first test of a SRB for SLS was completed in early 2015, a second test was performed in mid 2016 at Orbital ATK's Promontory, Utah facility.

External Tank Cargo Fairing 

DARPA studied modifying the current external tank design to be able to carry low density payloads in a  diameter fairing where the oxygen tank was currently. The Shuttle on average would only fly 66% of its payload capability but at nearly 100% of its payload volume. The external tank payload fairing would solve this problem. The oxygen tank would need to be redesigned as a cylindrical tank rather than conical and the clamshell payload fairing would be mounted directly on it. In this configuration the orbiter would launch without any payload. These studies were eventually abandoned due to the fact that the new aerodynamic profile would make a Return to Launch Site (RTLS) maneuver impossible. The proposal was reconfigured as an Aft Cargo Carrier (ACC) to be positioned towards the bottom of the tank rather on top. This idea made it far into development with Martin Marietta contracted to design and fabricate the container. First flights of the ACC were expected in 1986. After the Challenger disaster, the ACC as well as most payload related Shuttle upgrades were canceled.

Modified orbiters 
The following are all accounts mentioned or discussed by Carl F. Ehrlich, Jr. in Shuttle Variations And Derivatives That Never Happened - An Historical Review

Stretched orbiter 
In anticipation of upgraded boosters for the Shuttle, a design for a stretched orbiter was made. A new wing root and carry-through structure was designed to handle the additional weight at landing, keeping the outboard section of the original wings and requiring minimal modification. The  barrel section would be attached just forward of the 1305 bulkhead towards the rear of the vehicle.

Humpback orbiter 

An undefined need for more payload led to the idea of using the lee side section of the payload bay (at entry angle of attack) as an expanded payload bay. This would result in a "humpback" outsize cargo vehicle similar to the Airbus Beluga or the Aero Spacelines Super Guppy. The hypersonic aerodynamic characteristics during re-entry would stay mostly the same however issues would have most likely occurred at subsonic speeds without a high angle of attack.

Unpowered orbiter 

As an internal response to the Soviets' engineless Buran orbiter, an unpowered Orbiter was designed at Marshall Space Flight Center. A payload bay segment would be added to the rear of the spacecraft and look very similar to the  albeit with a few differences. Most equipment was stored in the rear of the craft to make up for lost weight and compensate for a lack of engines.

Crew Emergency Return Vehicle 

From the late 1980s to the early 2000s NASA, in one form or another, pursued the Crew Return Vehicle; a small spaceplane / capsule capable of returning crew from a space station in the event of an emergency. Candidates evaluated included an Apollo derived capsule, NASA's HL-20, HL-10, and M2F2, and the Air Force's X-24A. A sub-scale variant of the shuttle was proposed based on the ballistic return pod that was studied for the HLLV. The pressurized crew section would be modified into a lifting body. The main advantage of this design would be the proven technology and re-entry profile of the Shuttle.

High Capacity Orbiter 
A conceptual design for a high-capacity orbiter was drawn up. The concept used a series of canisters mounted in the payload bay that would carry 68 to 74 passengers in a double deck configuration similar to a Boeing 747. This moved the center of mass forward requiring minor changes to the wing structure adding more canard-like surfaces to allow more lifting surface. The design would be used for a Von Braun style space station that would need crew capacity in the hundreds.

See also 

 Space Shuttle
 Shuttle-derived vehicle
 Space Launch System
 Ares I
 Ares V
 Jupiter (rocket family)
 Artemis program
 Constellation program
Chrysler SERV

References

Reusable launch systems